was a black and white Japanese anime direct-to-TV short film aired in 1960. It was the first domestic anime ever televised.

Background
The show was an experimental anthology broadcast on the NHK channel.  It was divided into 3 parts featuring individual short fairy tales.  The first part of the show titled "The Third Plate" is technically the first anime segment ever televised.  In total, the show was 30 minutes long. Though it is questionable as to how widespread the anime actually was, since NHK was only broadcasting to 866 TV sets as of 1953.  There is no known estimate as to how much their infrastructure scaled just 7 years later.   Though the best evidence pointing to the anime as being black and white comes from the NHK station record, which indicated they did not make their first analog color broadcast until September 10, 1960, at 8:55pm 9 months later in Tokyo and Osaka.

Story
The story is an anthology of 3 separate fairy tales.

Staff
Kenji Miyazawa had already died when the show saw his story turned into an anime, even Mia Ogawa would also die just 1 year after the show's first broadcast in 1961.

References

External links

3-tsu no Hanashi in Animemorial (contains a screenshot)

1960 anime films
Anime short films
Anime television films
Fantasy anime and manga
Films based on works by Kenji Miyazawa
1960 television films
1960 films
1960s animated short films